The Shadow of Your Smile is the eighteenth studio album by American pop singer Andy Williams and was released in April 1966 by Columbia Records and included covers of "Michelle" and "Yesterday", the same pair of Beatles ballads that labelmate Johnny Mathis recorded for his 1966 album of the same name.  For Williams these selections initiated a trend away from the traditional pop formula that his album output at Columbia up until this point had adhered to.

The Williams release made its first appearance on Billboard magazine's Top LP's chart in the issue dated May 14 of that year and remained on the album chart for 54 weeks, peaking at number six.  It entered the UK charts in July and spent four weeks there, reaching number 27.  The album received Gold certification from the Recording Industry Association of America on September 27, 1966.

The A-side from this album, "Bye Bye Blues", "bubbled under" Billboard'''s Hot 100, reaching number 127, and got to number 18 on the magazine's Easy Listening (or Adult Contemporary) chart.

The album was released on compact disc for the first time as one of two albums on one CD by Collectables Records on March 23, 1999, the other album being Williams's Columbia release from the spring of 1965, Andy Williams' Dear Heart.  It was also released as one of two albums on one CD by Sony Music Distribution on December 28, 1999, paired this time with Williams's Columbia album from the fall of 1962, Warm and Willing. The Collectables CD was included in a box set entitled Classic Album Collection, Vol. 1, which contains 17 of his studio albums and three compilations and was released on June 26, 2001.

Reception

William Ruhlmann of AllMusic wrote that this album “had a slower, more languorous feel than earlier Williams albums, and it had more vocal risk-taking." He described “notable changes in Williams’ approach” that included the Beatles tracks and covers of two bossa nova songs by Antonio Carlos Jobim that “indicated that Williams was not content to simply turn out the same sort of album over and over, and that he was paying attention to the changes in popular music around him.”Billboard magazine described the album as "well produced and well performed."

Track listing
Side one
 "The Shadow of Your Smile (Love Theme from The Sandpiper)" from The Sandpiper (Johnny Mandel, Paul Francis Webster) – 3:04
 "That Old Feeling" from Vogues of 1938 (Lew Brown, Sammy Fain) – 2:51
 "Meditation"  with Antônio Carlos Jobim (Norman Gimbel, Antônio Carlos Jobim, Newton Mendonça) – 3:06
 "Try to Remember" from The Fantasticks (Tom Jones, Harvey Schmidt) – 2:55
 "Michelle" (John Lennon, Paul McCartney) – 3:25
 "Somewhere" from West Side Story (Leonard Bernstein, Stephen Sondheim) – 3:00

Side two
 "The Summer of Our Love" (Marty Paich, Paul Francis Webster) – 2:38
 "Peg O' My Heart" from Ziegfeld Follies (Alfred Bryan, Fred Fisher) – 2:24
 "How Insensitive "  with Antonio Carlos Jobim (Vinícius de Moraes, Norman Gimbel, Antonio Carlos Jobim) – 2:40
 "Yesterday" (John Lennon, Paul McCartney) – 2:50
 "Bye Bye Blues" (David Bennett; Chauncey Gray, Frederick Hamm, Bert Lown) – 2:43
 "A Taste of Honey" (Ric Marlow, Bobby Scott) – 2:47

Grammy nominations

This album brought the sixth and final Grammy nomination that Williams received over the course of his career, this time in the category for Best Vocal Performance, Male. This nomination did not focus on the performance of a particular song but rather Williams's performance of the album as a whole. The winner was Frank Sinatra for the single "Strangers in the Night", a song that Williams went on to record for his 1967 album Born Free''.

Personnel
From the liner notes for the original album:

Andy Williams – vocals
Robert Mersey - arranger/conductor ("That Old Feeling", "Meditation", "Peg O' My Heart", "How Insensitive", "Bye Bye Blues"), producer
Jack Elliott - arranger ("Yesterday"), conductor ("The Shadow of Your Smile", "Try to Remember", "Michelle", "Somewhere", "The Summer of Our Love", "Yesterday", "A Taste of Honey")
Bob Florence - arranger ("Try to Remember", "Michelle", "A Taste of Honey")
Dick Hazard - arranger ("The Shadow of Your Smile")
Johnny Mandel - arranger ("Somewhere")
Marty Paich - arranger ("The Summer of Our Love")

References

Bibliography

}

1966 albums
Andy Williams albums
Columbia Records albums
Albums arranged by Jack Elliott (composer)
Albums conducted by Jack Elliott (composer)
Albums arranged by Bob Florence
Albums arranged by Johnny Mandel
Albums arranged by Marty Paich
Albums arranged by Richard Hazard